Namwan River is a river in China and Myanmar. Namwan River rises in the mountain called Ganya Liangzi at the northern section of Longchuan County, Yunnan. It through the Longchuan county, as the major irrigation water source of the fields in the basin. And entering the valley at the southwest of Zhangfeng, the county town of Longchuan. Then it became the boundary between Myanmar and China until it entering Shweli River at Nongdao, Ruili.

See also
Namwan Assigned Tract

References

Rivers of Yunnan
Rivers of Myanmar
Geography of Dehong Dai and Jingpo Autonomous Prefecture
Geography of Kachin State
Longchuan County, Yunnan
Ruili